The 2007 Derbyshire Dales District Council election took place on 3 May 2007 to elect members of Derbyshire Dales District Council in Derbyshire, England. The whole council was up for election and the Conservative Party stayed in overall control of the council.

Election result
The Conservatives gained one seat from Labour in the only change at the election to take them to 26 seats. 10 of the Conservatives had been guaranteed seats before the election as they had no opponents. The Liberal Democrats remained on 8 seats, Labour dropped to 4 seats and there continued to be 1 independent.

Ward results

By-elections between 2007 and 2011

Masson
A by-election was held in Masson on 6 December 2007 after the death of Labour councillor John March. The by-election was won by Conservative Garry Purdy.

Matlock St Giles
A by-election was held in Matlock St Giles on 4 June 2009 after the death of Liberal Democrat councillor Tony Rosser. The seat was held for the Liberal Democrats by Cate Hopkinson.

Winster & South Darley
A by-election was held in Winster and South Darley after Conservative councillor John Moseley stepped down to join the Peak District National Park Authority. The seat was gained for Labour by Colin Swindell, who became the then youngest councillor on Derbyshire Dales Council at the age of 26.

References

2007
2007 English local elections
2000s in Derbyshire